Misión may refer to:
Misión, Baja California Sur
Misión, Sonora
La Misión (Rancho La Misión), Coahuila
La Misión, Coahuila
La Misión, Hidalgo
La Misión (Misión), Tamaulipas
La Misión (Mision), Tamaulipas
La Misión, Sinaloa

See also
La Misión (disambiguation)

ca:Missió